Iranian may refer to:

 Iranian peoples, the speakers of the Iranian languages. The term Iranic peoples is also used for this term to distinguish the pan ethnic term from Iranian, used for the people of Iran
 Iranian languages, a branch of the Indo-Iranian languages
 Something of, from, or related to Iran
 Iranians, a nation identified with Iran 
 Iranian diaspora, Iranians living outside Iran
 Iranian architecture, architecture of Iran and parts of the rest of West Asia
 Iranian foods, list of Iranian foods and dishes
 Iranian.com, also known as The Iranian and The Iranian Times

See also
 Persian (disambiguation)
 Iranians (disambiguation)
 Languages of Iran
 Ethnicities in Iran
 Demographics of Iran
 Indo-Iranian languages
 Irani (disambiguation)
 List of Iranians

Language and nationality disambiguation pages